At the 2011 Pan Arab Games, the shooting events were held at Lusail Complex in Doha, Qatar from 9–23 December. A total of 36 events were contested.

Medal summary

Men

Women

Medal table

References

External links
Shooting at official website

Pan Arab Games
Events at the 2011 Pan Arab Games
2011 Pan Arab Games
Shooting competitions in Qatar